Chen Zhuofu (born 21 October 1994) is a Chinese badminton player from Changsha, Hunan. He was part of the Chinese junior team that won the mixed team gold medals at the 2010, 2011 Asian Junior Championships and 2010 World Junior Championships. In the individuals junior event, he clinched the 2011 Asian mixed doubles bronze medal partnered with Xiong Rui. Chen represented Changsha competed at the 2011 National Intercity Games, and won the mixed doubles title partnered with Bao Yixin. Teamed-up with Shi Longfei in the men's doubles, they finished as the semi finalist and settled for the bronze medal at the 2014 Asian Championships, defeated by their teammates Li Junhui and Liu Yuchen with the score 9–21, 14–21.

Achievements

Asian Championships 
Men's doubles

Asian Junior Championships 
Mixed doubles

References

External links 
 

1994 births
Living people
Sportspeople from Changsha
Badminton players from Hunan
Chinese male badminton players